Chawpi Urqu (Quechua chawpi middle, center, urqu mountain, "middle mountain", also spelled Chaupi Orcco) is a mountain in the Andes of Peru, about  high. It is situated in the Ayacucho Region, Huanca Sancos Province, at the border of the districts of Lucanamarca and Sancos.

References

Mountains of Peru
Mountains of Ayacucho Region